Australis (Latin for southern or of the south) may refer to:

Science and technology
Australis, codename for an updated interface of Mozilla Firefox web browser
Australis (elm hybrid), a type of tree
Commelina virginica L. var. australis, a synonym for Commelina erecta
Terra Australis, or Australis, a hypothetical continent used on 15th–18th century maps

Transportation
Australis Motors, an Australian automobile manufactured from 1897 to 1907
SS America (1940), a passenger ship that sailed under the name Australis from 1964 to 1978

Other uses

Australis, the Latin derivation of the name of Australia, the country
Australis, a type of enemy in the video game Dino Crisis 3
Australis (musical project), the new age music project created in 2004 by Oscar Aguayo
Australis Aquaculture, a sustainable seafood company based in Turners Falls, Massachusetts
Australis Media, a former group participating in the Galaxy television channel

See also
Aurora Australis, also known as the Southern Lights